Sanfang Qixiang, literally Three Lanes and Seven Alleys, is a historic and cultural area in the city of Fuzhou. Its name is derived from the three lanes of Yijin, Wenru, and Guanglu and the seven alleys of Yangqiao, Langguan, Ta,  Huang, Anmin, Gong, Jipi. Because of its more than 400 rich, famous and powerful residents, this area has been dubbed the 'Beverly Hills' of imperial China. Since 2015, it has been designated as a 5A-Rated Tourist Attraction by the Ministry of Culture and Tourism.

Some of its notable former residents include:

 Zhang Jing
 Lin Zexu
 Chen Baochen
 Zheng Xiaoxu
 Shen Baozhen
 Sa Zhenbing
 Yan Fu
 Lin Shu
 Bing Xin
 Lu Yin
 Lin Huiyin
 Lin Juemin
 Wang Zhu
 Shu Chun Teng
 Deng Tuo

Thanks to its status as a living fossil of traditional Chinese urban wards of li and fang dating back to as early as the Tang Dynasty, it was inscribed on the UNESCO World Heritage Tentative List in 2013, and later designated a National Historic and Cultural Street by the Ministry of Housing and Urban-Rural Development and State Administration of Cultural Heritage in 2015. Owing to the extraordinary efforts to protect the historic fabrics from Sanfang Qixiang Administration, it was awarded an honorable mention of the 2015 UNESCO Asia-Pacific Heritage Awards.

References

Tourist attractions in Fuzhou
Buildings and structures in Fuzhou
Major National Historical and Cultural Sites in Fujian
Fuzhou